USS Cavalla (SS/SSK/AGSS-244), a Gato-class submarine, is a submarine of the United States Navy named for a salt water fish, best known for sinking the Japanese aircraft carrier Shōkaku.

Her keel was laid down on 4 March 1943 by Electric Boat Co., Groton, Connecticut. She was launched on 14 November 1943 (sponsored by Mrs. M. Comstock), and commissioned on 29 February 1944, Lieutenant Commander (later Rear Admiral) Herman J. Kossler, USN, (class of 1934) in command.

Operational history
Departing New London 11 April 1944, Cavalla arrived at Pearl Harbor 9 May, for voyage repairs and training. On 31 May 1944 the sub put to sea on active service for the first time.

First patrol
On her maiden patrol Cavalla, en route to her station in the eastern Philippines, made contact with a large Japanese task force on 17 June. Cavalla tracked the force for several hours, relaying information which contributed to the United States victory in the Battle of the Philippine Sea (commonly known as the "Marianas Turkey Shoot") on 19–20 June 1944. On 19 June, she caught the carrier Shōkaku recovering planes, and quickly fired a spread of six torpedoes, with three hits. The feat earned her a Presidential Unit Citation.

Second patrol
Cavalla's second patrol took her to the Philippine Sea as a member of a wolfpack operating in support of the invasion of Peleliu 15 September 1944.

Third patrol
The companion destroyer began depth charge attacks, while Cavalla evaded on the surface.

Fourth and fifth patrols
Cavalla cruised the South China and Java Seas on her fourth and fifth war patrols. Targets were few and far between, but she came to the aid of an ally on 21 May 1945. A month out on her fifth patrol, the submarine sighted , damaged by enemy depth charges and unable to submerge or make full speed. Cavalla stood by the damaged submarine and escorted her on the surface to Fremantle, arriving 27 May 1945.

Sixth patrol
Cavalla received the cease-fire order of 15 August while lifeguarding off Japan on her sixth war patrol. A few minutes later she was bombed by a Japanese plane that apparently had not yet received the same information or heard the Gyokuon-hōsō radio broadcast. She joined the fleet units entering Tokyo Bay 31 August, remained for the signing of the surrender on 2 September, then departed the next day for New London, arriving 6 October 1945. She was placed out of commission in reserve there 16 March 1946.

Postwar
Recommissioned 10 April 1951, Cavalla was assigned to Submarine Squadron 8 and engaged in various fleet exercises in the Caribbean and off Nova Scotia. She was placed out of commission 3 September 1952 and entered Electric Boat Co. yard for conversion to a hunter-killer submarine (reclassified SSK-244, 18 February 1953).  The SSK conversion included remodeling Cavallas bow with the addition of a curved housing for a BQR-4 sonar system.  The conversion included removal of two bow torpedo tubes, along with remodeling the original conning tower and bridge into the sail visible today.

Cavalla was recommissioned 15 July 1953 and assigned to Submarine Squadron 10. Her new sonar made Cavalla valuable for experimentation, and she was transferred to Submarine Development Group 2 on 1 January 1954, to evaluate new weapons and equipment, and to participate in fleet exercises. She also cruised to European waters several times to take part in NATO exercises, and visited Norfolk, Va., for the International Naval Review (11–12 June 1957). On 15 August 1959, her classification reverted to SS-244.

Cavalla successfully assisted Thresher'''s restart of her reactor. Thresher was lost during post-overhaul sea trials on 10 April 1963 during a deep dive.

FateCavalla was reclassified an "auxiliary submarine", AGSS-244, in July 1963. Cavalla was decommissioned and struck from the Naval Register on 30 December 1969.

On 21 January 1971, Cavalla was transferred to the Texas Submarine Veterans of World War II. She now resides at Galveston Naval Museum in Seawolf Park on Pelican Island, just north of Galveston, Texas. Cavalla'' has undergone an extensive restoration process (see photos, below), and is open for self-guided tours. Among the early benefactors was then President of the Texas United States Submarine Veterans of World War II, Paul Francis Stolpman, and the former Texas secretary of state George Strake, Jr.

Gallery

See also

National Register of Historic Places listings in Galveston County, Texas

References

Attribution

External links

  USS Cavalla Website
 history.navy.mil: USS Cavalla
  navsource.org: USS Cavalla
      hazegray.org: USS Cavalla
 
  Kill Record:  USS Cavalla
Houston Chronicle: USS Cavalla Restoration 2016

Gato-class submarines
World War II submarines of the United States
Cold War submarines of the United States
Museum ships in Texas
Museums in Galveston, Texas
National Register of Historic Places in Galveston County, Texas
Ships built in Groton, Connecticut
Ships on the National Register of Historic Places in Texas
1943 ships
Military and war museums in Texas